Margarita Delgado (born 30 January 1970) is a Peruvian volleyball player. She competed in the women's tournament at the 1996 Summer Olympics.

References

1970 births
Living people
Peruvian women's volleyball players
Olympic volleyball players of Peru
Volleyball players at the 1996 Summer Olympics
Place of birth missing (living people)
Pan American Games medalists in volleyball
Pan American Games bronze medalists for Peru
Volleyball players at the 1991 Pan American Games
Medalists at the 1991 Pan American Games
20th-century Peruvian women
21st-century Peruvian women